Jeff Robinson (born July 8, 1988) is an American professional basketball player. Robinson is 6 ft 6 in tall and usually plays the power forward or small forward position.

Career
After recording 12.1 points and 6.4 rebounds per game in his senior year with the Seton Hall Pirates, Robinson started his professional career with Fürstenfeld in Austria. Robinson averaged 15.5 points and 6.9 rebounds in the Österreichische Basketball Bundesliga.

In the 2012–13 season, Robinson played in Poland for AZS Koszalin. In the summer of 2013, Robinson played in the Dominican Republic for Huracanes del Atlantico. In October 2013, Robinson signed a three month-contract with the GasTerra Flames in the Netherlands. Despite Robinson saying he wanted to stay and the club's intentions to keep him, both couldn't reach an agreement.

At January 30, 2014 it was announced that Robinson returned to his old Polish club AZS Koszalin.

The Basketball Tournament
Jeff Robinson played for Hall In in the 2018 edition of The Basketball Tournament. In 2 games, he averaged 13.5 points, 4.5 rebounds, and 1.5 steals per game. Hall In reached the second round before falling to the Golden Eagles.

References

1988 births
Living people
American expatriate basketball people in Austria
American expatriate basketball people in the Dominican Republic
American expatriate basketball people in Israel
American expatriate basketball people in Lithuania
American expatriate basketball people in the Netherlands
American expatriate basketball people in Poland
American men's basketball players
AZS Koszalin players
Basketball players from Trenton, New Jersey
BC Dzūkija players
BSC Fürstenfeld Panthers players
Donar (basketball club) players
Dutch Basketball League players
Huracanes del Atlántico players
Ironi Ramat Gan players
Memphis Tigers men's basketball players
Power forwards (basketball)
Seton Hall Pirates men's basketball players
Small forwards
The Patrick School alumni